The  
('Girl Scouts of Georgia 'Dia') is the national Girl Scouting organisation of Georgia. It serves 805 members (as of 2006). The girls-only became an associate member of the WAGGGS in 1999.

Dia itself is an ancient Georgian feminine name, referring to the goddess associated in Georgian mythology with the planet Jupiter.

In 1993 due to a majority of boys in the membership, and at the request of the girls' representatives, the parent association was renamed Guides and Scouts Association of the Republic of Georgia. April 19 is the official holiday as the anniversary of the first national Girl Scout conference in 1997. Georgian Girl Scouts have a relationship with the Northwest Georgia Girl Scout Council.

Program, sections and ideals
The association is divided in three sections according to age:
  – ages 7 to 9
  – ages 10 to 15
  – ages 16 to 32

The trefoil of the Girl Guide membership badge is made of the letters d-i-a in the Georgian alphabet, stylized to look like an adult embracing children.

Guide Law 
 A Girl Scout is reliable and can be trusted.
 A Girl Scout smiles and sings under all difficulties.
 A Girl Scout respects time.
 A Girl Scout is loyal to her leaders and subordinates.
 A Girl Scout is a friend to all and a sister to other Girl Scout.
 A Girl Scout is a friend to the nature.
 A Girl Scout faces challenge and learns from her experiences.
 A Girl Scout is patient and considerate.
 A Girl Scout is polite.
 A Girl Scout is pure in thought, in word and in deed.

Guide Promise
I promise that I will do my best
To do my duty to God
To serve my country
To help people at all times
To live by the Girl Scout Law.

Further reading
 World Association of Girl Guides and Girl Scouts, World Bureau (2002), Trefoil Round the World. Eleventh Edition 1997.

See also
Sakartvelos Skauturi Modzraobis Organizatsia
Patriot camps

References

External links
official website

Scouting in Georgia (country)
World Association of Girl Guides and Girl Scouts member organizations
Youth organizations established in 1992